The Negishi Line is a Japanese railway line which connects Yokohama and Ōfuna stations. It is operated by East Japan Railway Company (JR East). Freight trains also operate on this line, and it is essential for the southern Keihin region.

The Negishi Line does not exist as an independent service. Keihin-Tōhoku Line—Negishi Line trains are recognizable by their light blue stripe (the line's color on maps is also light blue).

A few trains travel through to  via the Yokohama Line.

Basic data
Double-tracking: Entire line
Railway signalling: 
Yokohama – Ōfuna (Passenger services): Automatic Train Control, D-ATC
Sakuragichō – Ōfuna (Freight services): Automatic Signaling Block, ATS-P

Services
During the daytime, trains operate every 4 minutes between Yokohama and Sakuragichō stations (including Yokohama Line trains). Between Sakuragichō and Isogo, trains operate every 7 minutes, and Isogo and Ōfuna every 10 minutes.

The Hamakaiji limited express service also operates on the Negishi Line.

Freight services
Freight trains are a common sight on the Negishi Line. The following rail companies either link up to or use the Negishi Line for the purpose of transporting freight.
 Takashima Freight Line()
 Kanagawa Rinkai Railway
 Tōkaidō Freight Line

Station list 
 All stations are located in Kanagawa Prefecture.
 All trains stop at every station (excluding some seasonal trains).

History
The branch was named the Tōkaidō Main Line Branch Line on October 12, 1909.

Takashimachō Station opened between Kanagawa and Yokohama on December 20, 1914 as the terminus of an electrified Keihin Line (the predecessor of today's Keihin-Tōhoku Line). On August 15, 1915, a new Yokohama Station opened, absorbing nearby Takashimachō and becoming the new terminus of the line. The old Yokohama station was renamed  and the Sakuragichō – Hodogaya bypass closed. Keihin Line service was extended to Sakuragichō on December 30, 1915 when freight service ceased on the branch.

The line was planned to be extended to Ōfuna, and in 1920 the Government Railways decided that the extension route would be parallel to the Ōoka River and then turn to Hodogaya. From Hodogaya to Ōfuna, additional tracks would be added to the existing Tōkaidō Main Line. However, this plan was scrapped after the Great Kantō earthquake of 1923. Later, the planned extension was revived with a completely different route: "The railway from Sakuragichō in Kanagawa Prefecture to " was added to the list of railways to be built in the Railway Construction Act on March 31, 1937. This provision was the basis for the construction of the present-day Negishi Line.

Yokohama Station moved on October 15, 1928; between then and January 26, 1930, temporary platforms for the Keihin Line were provided on either side of the station.

The line was renamed the Negishi Line after one of the new stations. The Takashima freight line opened on June 1 that year and freight service returned to the line after a nearly 50-year absence. 103 series trains were introduced to the line in October 1965.

The final section between Yōkōdai and  opened on April 9, 1973; On October 1 that year, freight service commenced between Ōfuna and Isogo.

Freight services between Ōfuna and Isogo ceased on February 1, 1984; three days prior to this, the line adopted Automatic Train Control. On April 1, 1987 the Japanese National Railways were privatized, with ownership of the Negishi Line passing to JR East; JR Freight took over freight services on the line.

Some trains began operating through onto the Yokosuka Line on March 15, 2008.

Accidents
The Sakuragichō train fire occurred on April 24, 1951.

Rolling Stock

 E233-1000 series
 E233-6000 series (used on Yokohama Line inter-running services)

Footnotes

References

External links

 Stations of the Keihintohoku Line＆the Negishi Line (JR East) 

 
Lines of East Japan Railway Company
Railway lines in Kanagawa Prefecture
1067 mm gauge railways in Japan
Railway lines opened in 1872